ManyCam is an application program that allows users to use their webcam with multiple different video chat and video streaming applications simultaneously for Windows and MacOS computers. Users can also add live graphics effects and filters to video feeds. ManyCam is available for annual or biennial licensing in different versions. It was previously published as freeware. ManyCam also publishes mobile apps.

ManyCam uses a webcam or video camera as input for the software itself and then replicates itself as an alternative source of input. Because of this, ManyCam works with nearly all chat software that can use alternative video sources.

See also
 Comparison of webcam software
Comparison of screencasting software

References

External links

Freemium
Video software
Webcams
Screencasting_software